The Beautiful Adventure is a 1917 American silent drama film starring Ann Murdock, a stage star. The film is based on the 1913 Broadway stage play The Beautiful Adventure in which Murdock had starred. The film was directed by Dell Henderson and released through the Mutual Film company. It is a lost film.

Plot
As described in a film magazine, Andre D'Eguzon (Powell) and Helen De Travillac (Murdock) are in love, but the mother of Andre, Countess D'Eguzon (Sergeantson), interferes and brings about the engagement of Helen to Valentine Borroyer (Norton), who makes a diary note of every event. On the morning of the wedding Andre goes to Helen and pleads with her not to marry Valentine. Helen tears off her wedding veil and flees with Andre to the home of her grandmother. They find themselves in many compromising situations as the grandmother believes that they are husband and wife. Helen gets Valentine to tell Andre's mother that he does not love Helen and that Helen and Andre should marry. And they do.

Cast

See also
The Beautiful Adventure (1932, German)
The Beautiful Adventure (1932, French)
The Beautiful Adventure (1942)

References

External links

1917 films
American silent feature films
Lost American films
American films based on plays
1917 drama films
American black-and-white films
Films set in France
Mutual Film films
Silent American drama films
1917 lost films
Lost drama films
Films with screenplays by Joseph F. Poland
Films directed by Dell Henderson
1910s American films